The 160th Rifle Division of the Soviet Union's Red Army may refer to:

 160th Rifle Division (1940 formation)
 160th Rifle Division (1941 formation)